Forrest Gump is a 1994 romantic comedy-drama film based on the 1986 novel of the same name by Winston Groom. With a screenplay by Eric Roth and starring popular actor Tom Hanks, the film premiered in Los Angeles, California on June 23, 1994. It was released in the United States and Canada on July 6, 1994, opening in 1,595 domestic theaters and earning $24,450,602 on its first weekend. Forrest Gump grossed $677 million and was at its time the fourth highest-grossing film of all time (behind only E.T. the Extra-Terrestrial, Star Wars IV: A New Hope, and Jurassic Park). Despite its praise, it has only a 71% approval rating on Rotten Tomatoes.

Forrest Gump won six Academy Awards for Best Picture, Best Actor in a Leading Role, Best Director, Best Visual Effects, Best Adapted Screenplay, and Best Film Editing. Hanks became the first actor since Spencer Tracy to win two consecutive Academy Awards for Best Actor; he won the previous year for Philadelphia. 

The film garnered seven Golden Globe Award nominations, winning three of them, including Best Actor – Motion Picture Drama, Best Director – Motion Picture, and Best Motion Picture – Drama. The film was also nominated for six Saturn Awards and won two for Best Fantasy Film and Best Supporting Actor (Film). The film also won the Outstanding Achievement in Special Effects award at the 1995 BAFTA Film Awards.

Forrest Gump also won numerous other awards, such as Best Actor for Tom Hanks from the Screen Actors Guild Awards in its first year, from a total of four category nominations. The film received three nominations from the MTV Movie Awards, but left empty handed. The film swept the Peoples Choice Awards in its three nominations. The American Society of Cinematographers nominated the film's cinematographer Don Burgess for Outstanding Achievement in Cinematography in Theatrical Release, but he lost to Roger Deakins of Shawshank Redemption'''

The film was selected for preservation by the Library of Congress in the United States National Film Registry in 2011, being deemed "culturally, historically, or aesthetically significant". The movie has made multiple American Film Institute lists, including one for quotations for its "Mama always said life was like a box of chocolates. You never know what you're gonna get.", ranking 40th on 100 Years...100 Movie Quotes. The film ranked 240 on Empire's list of the 500 Greatest Movies Of All Time. A chain of restaurants, Bubba Gump Shrimp Company, opened with a name drawn from the film.

 Awards and nominations 

 Year-end lists 

 1st – National Board of Review
 1st – Douglas Armstrong, The Milwaukee Journal 1st – Todd Anthony, Miami New Times 1st – Sandi Davis, The Oklahoman 1st – Christopher Sheid, The Munster Times 2nd – Michael MacCambridge, Austin American-Statesman 2nd – Bob Strauss, Los Angeles Daily News 2nd –  Glenn Lovell, San Jose Mercury News 2nd – Joan Vadeboncoeur, Syracuse Herald American 3rd – Scott Schuldt, The Oklahoman 3rd – Steve Persall, St. Petersburg Times 5th – Mack Bates, The Milwaukee Journal 6th – Gene Siskel, The Chicago Tribune 6th – James Berardinelli, ReelViews 6th – Robert Denerstein, Rocky Mountain News 9th – Stephen Hunter, The Baltimore Sun 10th – John Hurley, Staten Island Advance 10th – Sean P. Means, The Salt Lake Tribune 10th – Dan Craft, The Pantagraph Top 10 (listed alphabetically, not ranked) – Mike Mayo, The Roanoke Times Top 10 (listed alphabetically, not ranked) – William Arnold, Seattle Post-Intelligencer Top 10 (listed alphabetically, not ranked) – Bob Ross, The Tampa Tribune Top 10 (listed alphabetically, not ranked) – Steve Murray, The Atlanta Journal-Constitution Top 10 (listed alphabetically, not ranked) – Jeff Simon, The Buffalo News Top 10 (not ranked) – Dennis King, Tulsa World Top 10 (not ranked) – George Meyer, The Ledger Top 10 (not ranked) – Bob Carlton, The Birmingham News Honorable mentions – Mike Clark, USA Today 10th worst – Janet Maslin, The New York Times Most overrated movie – David Stupich, The Milwaukee Journal''

References

External links
 

Lists of accolades by film